Following are the results of the U.S. Women's Chess Championship from 1937 to date.  The tournament determines the woman chess champion of the United States.

List of U.S. Women's Chess Champions
1937 Adele Rivero
1938 Mona May Karff
1940 Adele Rivero (2)
1941 Mona May Karff (2)
1942 Mona May Karff (3)
1944 Gisela Kahn Gresser
1946 Mona May Karff (4)
1948 Gisela Kahn Gresser (2) – Mona May Karff (5)
1951 Mary Bain
1953 Mona May Karff (6)
1955 Gisela Kahn Gresser (3) – Nancy Roos
1957 Gisela Kahn Gresser (4) – Sonja Graf
1959 Lisa Lane
1962 Gisela Kahn Gresser (5)
1964 Sonja Graf (2)
1965 Gisela Kahn Gresser (6)
1966 Gisela Kahn Gresser (7) – Lisa Lane (2)
1967 Gisela Kahn Gresser (8)
1969 Gisela Kahn Gresser (9)
1972 Eva Aronson – Marilyn Braun
1974 Mona May Karff (7)
1975 Diane Savereide
1976 Diane Savereide (2)
1978 Diane Savereide (3) – Rachel Crotto
1979 Rachel Crotto (2)
1981 Diane Savereide (4)
1984 Diane Savereide (5)
1986 Inna Izrailov
1987 Anna Akhsharumova
1989 Alexey Root
1990 Elena Donaldson
1991 Esther Epstein – Irina Levitina
1992 Irina Levitina (2)
1993 Elena Donaldson (2) – Irina Levitina (3)
1994 Elena Donaldson (3)
1995 Anjelina Belakovskaia – Sharon Burtman
1996 Anjelina Belakovskaia (2)
1997 Esther Epstein (2)
1998 Irina Krush
1999 Anjelina Belakovskaia (3)
2000 Elina Groberman – Camilla Baginskaite
2001/02 Jennifer Shahade
2003 Anna Hahn
2004 Jennifer Shahade (2)
2005 Rusudan Goletiani
2006 Anna Zatonskih
2007 Irina Krush (2)
2008 Anna Zatonskih (2)
2009 Anna Zatonskih (3)
2010 Irina Krush (3)
 2011 Anna Zatonskih (4)
 2012 Irina Krush (4)
 2013 Irina Krush (5)
 2014 Irina Krush (6)
 2015 Irina Krush (7)
 2016 Nazí Paikidze
 2017 Sabina-Francesca Foisor
 2018 Nazí Paikidze (2)
 2019 Jennifer Yu
 2020 Irina Krush (8)
 2021 Carissa Yip
 2022 Jennifer Yu (2)

Crosstables

1962
The 1962 Women's Championship was a ten-round tournament held from April 21 to May 6 in New York City at the Marshall Chess Club and the Manhattan Chess Club, with the exception of round 8, which was played at the London Terrace chess club.  Edward Lasker served as the tournament director.
Player invitations were made on the basis of USCF ratings, and the field of eleven included defending champion Lisa Lane, former champions Gisela Kahn Gresser, Mary Bain, and Mona May Karff, and Amateur Champion Greta Fuchs, all from New York City.

Gresser won the title for the fifth time, the second time she won the title unshared.  The title was not decided until the final round, when Gresser defeated defending champion Lane playing the White side of a Sicilian Defense.  The championship was also the Women's Zonal tournament, so Gresser and Lane qualified to play in the 1963 Women's Candidates Tournament.

2009
{| class="wikitable" style="text-align: center;"
|+  USA-ch (Women) Saint Louis 2009
!   !! Player !! Rating !! 1 !! 2 !! 3 !! 4 !! 5 !! 6 !! 7 !! 8 !! 9 !! 0 !! Points !! TB !! Perf. !! +/-
|-
| 1 || align=left|         || 2462 ||* ||½ ||1 ||1 ||1 ||1 ||1 ||1 ||1 ||1 ||8½ ||      || 2765 || +20
|-
| 2 || align=left|    ||2317  ||½ ||* ||0 ||½ ||1 ||½ ||1 ||1 ||1 ||1 ||6½||      || 2455 || +18
|-
| 3 || align=left|            ||2458  ||0 ||1 ||* ||½ ||0 ||1 ||1 ||½ ||½||1 ||5½        ||21.50 || 2353 || +10
|-       
| 4 || align=left|        ||2220  ||0 ||½ ||½ ||* ||1 ||½ ||1 ||0 ||1 ||1 ||5½        ||20.25 || 2378 || +20
|-
| 5 || align=left|       ||2275  ||0 ||0 ||1 ||0 ||* ||½ ||½ ||1 ||0 ||1 ||4        || || 2256 || -2
|-
| 6 || align=left|      ||2391  ||0 ||½ ||0 ||½ ||½ ||* ||0 ||1 ||0 ||1 ||3½         ||13.50 || 2203 || -22
|-
| 7 || align=left|||2320  ||0 ||0 ||0 ||0 ||½ ||1 ||* ||1 ||1 ||0 ||3½         ||11.00 || 2211 || -13
|-
| 8 || align=left|           ||2285  ||0 ||0 ||½ ||1 ||0 ||0 ||0 ||* ||1 ||½ ||3 ||      || 2173 || -13
|-
| 9 || align=left|                ||1935  ||0 ||0 ||½ ||0 ||1 ||1 ||0 ||0 ||* ||0 ||2½        ||10.25 || 2165 || +16
|- 
| 10 || align=left|    ||2258  ||0 ||0 ||0 ||0 ||0 ||0 ||1 ||½ ||1 ||* ||2½        ||7.50  || 2130 || -15
|}

Average Elo: 2292 <=> Cat: 2

2010
{| class="wikitable" style="text-align: center;"
|+  USA-ch (Women) Saint Louis 2010
!   !! Player !! Rating !! 1 !! 2 !! 3 !! 4 !! 5 !! 6 !! 7 !! 8 !! 9 !! 0 !! Points !! TB !! Perf. !! +/-
|-
| 1 || align=left|            || 2476 ||* ||½ ||1 ||1 ||1 ||½ ||1 ||1 ||1 ||1 ||8 ||      || 2650 || +14
|-
| 2 || align=left|         ||2470  ||½ ||* ||½ ||1 ||1 ||1 ||1 ||½ ||1 ||1 ||7½||28.25 || 2569 || +10
|-
| 3 || align=left|       ||2310  ||0 ||½ ||* ||1 ||1 ||1 ||1 ||1 ||1 ||1 ||7½||25.75 || 2587 || +30
|-
| 4 || align=left|      ||2319  ||0 ||0 ||0 ||* ||½ ||0 ||1 ||1 ||1 ||1 ||4½||11.25 || 2307 || -2
|-
| 5 || align=left|        ||2265  ||0 ||0 ||0 ||½ ||* ||1 ||0 ||1 ||1 ||1 ||4½||11.25 || 2312 || +6
|-
| 6 || align=left|    ||2343  ||½ ||0 ||0 ||1 ||0 ||* ||0 ||½ ||1 ||1 ||4 ||12.00 || 2266 || -10
|-
| 7 || align=left|           ||2236  ||0 ||0 ||0 ||0 ||1 ||1 ||* ||1 ||0 ||1 ||4 ||12.00 || 2277 || +4
|-
| 8 || align=left|||2317  ||0 ||½ ||0 ||0 ||0 ||½ ||0 ||* ||1 ||1 ||3 ||      || 2187 || -16
|-
| 9 || align=left|      ||2160  ||0 ||0 ||0 ||0 ||0 ||0 ||1 ||0 ||* ||½ ||1½||      || 2045 || -11
|-
| 10 || align=left|         ||2182  ||0 ||0 ||0 ||0 ||0 ||0 ||0 ||0 ||½ ||* ||½||      || 1830 || -24
|}

Average Elo: 2307 <=> Cat: 3

See also
U.S. Women's Open Chess Championship
Women's World Chess Championship
U.S. Chess Championship

References

United States Chess Federation (official website, retrieved 21 May 2007)

External links
 Video of final game of the 2008 championship
 Interactive Gantt chart of participants and winners, 1937-2020
 Timeline of US Women's Chess Champions, 1937-2020
 Crosstables of all editions

Chess national championships
Women's chess national championships
Women's Championship
1937 establishments in the United States
1937 in chess